Behne is a surname. Notable people with the surname include:

Adolf Behne (1885–1948), German architect and architectural writer
Frederick Behne (1873–1918), fireman first class serving in the United States Navy who received the Medal of Honor for bravery

See also 
 Bene (disambiguation)

German-language surnames
Surnames from given names